The Office of the State Counsellor of the Republic of the Union of Myanmar is a ministry-level body that serves the State Counsellor of Myanmar. The office was led by union minister Kyaw Tint Swe. It was dissolved by SAC on 22 February 2021.

Departments
Union Minister Office
Department of Union Peace Formation
Department of Policy Affairs

List of Ministers

References 

StateCounsellorOffice
Ministries established in 2017
2017 establishments in Myanmar